Pterolophia consularis is a species of beetle in the family Cerambycidae. It was described by Francis Polkinghorne Pascoe in 1866.

References

consularis
Beetles described in 1866